The Military College of Telecommunication Engineering (MCTE) is the engineering training establishment for the Corps of Signals, established 1911, of the Indian Army. It is located near Indore, in the town formerly known as Mhow, now called Dr Ambedkar Nagar, in Madhya Pradesh.

References

External links 
  Corps of Signals at Indian Army website

Military academies of India
Military communications of India
Telecommunications engineering
Telecommunication education
Universities and colleges in Mhow
Educational institutions established in 1911
1911 establishments in India